Animal Antics is a twice BAFTA-nominated, live-action British pre-school series which aired on Channel 5's Milkshake strand. It was one of the first original children's program to air when it launched in 1997. The series was produced by Two Side Productions  and it Initially  run for 80 episodes.  Although it only ran for 1 series, 4 spin-off's have been produced between 2001 and 2015  each narrated by Derek Griffiths.

Original series
Animal antics was created as a flagship show for channel 5's strand for children, 'Milkshake!'. It was one of the first original show to air in 1997 when the channel launched. Each episode featured stories of wildlife and farmyard characters  narrated by David Griffiths in their natural environment. The series took a fly on the wall look into their lives with Griffiths portraying each animal in a comedy style. The show aired weekday mornings. Episodes also aired weekends during Tickle, Patch and Friends.  The show has been broadcast around the world on Nick Jr. A Welsh version of Insect Antics dubbed 'Y Crads Bach' for S4C also aired in 2000.  In 2018 episodes started airing on the 'Wizz' YouTube channel for children.

Spin-Off series

Little Antics
In 2001 a new series entitled 'Little Antics' was produced for 40 episodes and Like Animal Antics the series adopted  the fly on the wall style. This time each episode followed  the  lives of young children, both in and out of school, mainly in a reception class in Malvern.  Again voiced by Derek Griffiths with Jan Francis. This series was directed by Lisa Evans. This series was re-run on Tiny Living in 2003.

Insect Antics
In 2003 a new 40-episode series aired again narrated by Griffiths. This series was directed Tracy Nampala but now followed the lives of insects. Victoria Arlidge provided the music for this run. An episode from this series was issued on the 'Milkshake! Treats' DVD in 2005.

Aussie Antics
A further 40 episodes  aired in 2004 and was now called Aussie Antics.  Again showing different  animals in their natural environment. This time focusing on animals that live in Australia. Tracy Nampala also directed this series.

Seaside Antics
In 2015 a new set of  20 episodes started airing entitled Seaside Antics. This time the series followed a host of different  animals that lived by the sea. This series was produced by Catherine Robins and aired a decade after the last. Again Griffiths narrated. This is the last to have aired to date.

References

External links

Channel 5 (British TV channel) original programming
1997 British television series debuts
2002 British television series endings
1990s British children's television series
2000s British children's television series
Television programming blocks in Europe
Breakfast television in the United Kingdom
English-language television shows